Narlıca (known as Narlija in Arabic) is a town in the central district (Antakya) of Hatay Province, Turkey.At  Narlıca is  north east of the city center. The population of Narlıca was 15,692 as of 2012.

References

Populated places in Hatay Province
Towns in Turkey
Antakya District